Marco Reyna (born August 20, 1979) is a Mexican former professional footballer.

External links
Ascenso MX 

Liga MX players
Living people
1979 births
Footballers from Mexico City
Mexican footballers

Association footballers not categorized by position
21st-century Mexican people